Ken McEachern (born January 14, 1953) is a former professional Canadian football player who played eleven years in the Canadian Football League. McEachern played defensive back for the Saskatchewan Roughriders and Toronto Argonauts from 1974 to 1984. He was a CFL All-Star in '80 and '81 and helped the Argonauts win the 71st Grey Cup in 1983. He played his college football at Weber State University.

His son, Mike McEachern is a former linebacker at Western Illinois University and was drafted 22nd overall in the 2008 CFL Draft.

References 

1953 births
Living people
Canadian football defensive backs
Canadian players of Canadian football
Saskatchewan Roughriders players
Toronto Argonauts players
Weber State Wildcats football players